Culloville railway station was on the Dundalk and Enniskillen Railway in the Republic of Ireland.

The Dundalk and Enniskillen Railway opened the station on 1 April 1851.

It closed on 14 October 1957.

Routes

References

Disused railway stations in County Monaghan
Railway stations opened in 1851
Railway stations closed in 1957
1851 establishments in Ireland
1957 disestablishments in Ireland

Railway stations in the Republic of Ireland opened in 1851